The Tracks Across Borders Scenic and Historic Byway is an  Colorado Scenic and Historic Byway located in La Plata and Archuleta counties, Colorado, USA. From Durango, Colorado, the southern terminal of the Durango and Silverton Narrow Gauge Railroad, a National Historic Landmark, the byway follows the roadbed of the historic narrow-gauge Denver and Rio Grande Western Railroad through the Southern Ute Indian Reservation to the New Mexico state line.  At the state line, the byway connects with the  Narrow-Gauge Scenic Byway which continues on through the Jicarilla Apache Indian Reservation to Dulce, New Mexico. New Mexico plans to continue the byway on to Chama, New Mexico, the southern terminal of the Cumbres and Toltec Scenic Railroad, another National Historic Landmark, reconnecting the historic railway between Antonito, Colorado and Silverton, Colorado.

The byway connects to the San Juan Skyway Scenic and Historic Byway at Durango.

Route

Gallery

See also

History Colorado
List of scenic byways in Colorado
Scenic byways in the United States

Notes

References

External links

America's Scenic Byways: Colorado
Colorado Department of Transportation
Colorado Scenic & Historic Byways Commission
Colorado Scenic & Historic Byways
Colorado Travel Map
Colorado Tourism Office
History Colorado

Colorado Scenic and Historic Byways
Transportation in Colorado
Transportation in Archuleta County, Colorado
Transportation in La Plata County, Colorado
Tourist attractions in Colorado
Tourist attractions in Archuleta County, Colorado
Tourist attractions in La Plata County, Colorado
U.S. Route 160
U.S. Route 550